Harold McGuirk (17 October 1906 – 19 June 1984) was an Australian cricketer. He played two first-class matches for New South Wales in 1926/27.

See also
 List of New South Wales representative cricketers

References

External links
 

1906 births
1984 deaths
Australian cricketers
New South Wales cricketers